Martina Navratilova and Betty Stöve were the defending champions, but competed this year with different partners.

Navratilova teamed up with Billie Jean King and successfully defended her title by defeating Kerry Reid and Wendy Turnbull 7–6, 6–4 in the final.

Stöve teamed up with Chris Evert and lost in first round to Betsy Nagelsen and Pam Shriver.

Seeds

Draw

Finals

Top half

Section 1

Section 2

Bottom half

Section 3

Section 4

References
 Official Results Archive (WTA)
1978 US Open – Women's draws and results at the International Tennis Federation

Women's Doubles
US Open (tennis) by year – Women's doubles